Heteronida clivicola is a species of squat lobster in the family Munididae. The name refers to the Roman goddess Clivicola.

References

Squat lobsters
Crustaceans described in 2006